Ward Field may refer to:

Ward Field (airport), a public airport located one mile west of Gasquet, California
Ward Field (Bourbonnais), a football stadium at Olivet Nazarene University